The Estadio Zamora is a multi-use stadium in Zamora, Michoacán, Mexico.  It is currently used mostly for football matches and is the home stadium for Real Zamora.  The stadium has a capacity of 7,200 people.

References

External links

Sports venues in Michoacán
Zamora
Athletics (track and field) venues in Mexico